Dame Mary Lesley Perkins,  (born 14 February 1944) is an English billionaire who is the co-founder of Specsavers, the British retail optometry chain.

Together with her husband, co-founder and chairman Doug Perkins, Dame Mary has three children, all of whom work for Specsavers, and are eventually expected to take over the privately-owned company.

In spring 2015, her net worth was estimated to be £1.45 billion.

Early life
She attended Fairfield Grammar School in Bristol. She then went to Cardiff University to train as an optometrist. At Cardiff, she met Doug Perkins, whom she later married. The couple established their first business in Bristol in the 1960s. This became a chain of optometrists around Bristol, which they sold for £2 million in 1980, and from which they continue to receive income. After the sale the couple moved to Guernsey, where Mary's father had retired.

Specsavers
Mary and Doug Perkins established Specsavers in Guernsey in 1984. In 2007 it was the largest privately owned opticians in the world, with nearly 900 stores across the UK and Europe. By 2011 the company had an annual turnover of £1.5bn and over 30,000 staff in markets in the UK, Europe and Australasia.

Her current title at Specsavers is "founder". Dame Mary sits on the company board, oversees business development and has particular responsibility for running PR. She has admitted donning disguises and visiting Specsavers stores, posing as a customer.

Awards and honours
Perkins was made an honorary fellow of Cardiff University in 2005. The same year she received the Rotary International Community and Vocational Service Award for her services to charity and in 2006 won the inaugural Spirit of everywoman Award. Perkins was the first female optometrist in the UK to receive the title of Dame Commander of the Order of the British Empire (DBE) in 2007.

The accolade was also in recognition of her other charitable work, including the Guernsey annual "Specsavers Liberation Tea Dance for pensioners", and her directorship of Women's Refuge and Age Concern. She is also a patron to leading children's charity Kidscape.

In 2012 Perkins was awarded an Honorary Doctorate of Business from Plymouth University

In February 2013 she was assessed as one of the 100 most powerful women in the United Kingdom by Woman's Hour on BBC Radio 4.

In July 2015 she was made an Officer Sister of the Most Venerable Order of the Hospital of Saint John of Jerusalem.

In October 2017, Dame Mary was honoured with an EY Entrepreneur Of The Year UK Lifetime Achievement Award for her continued contribution to entrepreneurship and the economy.

Other
Perkins is a founding patron of the not-for-profit social enterprise, Modern Muse.

References

1944 births
British retail company founders
Dames Commander of the Order of the British Empire
English billionaires
Businesspeople from Bristol
Living people
People educated at Fairfield Grammar School
Alumni of Cardiff University
Guernsey women